Frank Lentricchia (born 1940) is an American literary critic, novelist, and film teacher. He received his Ph.D. and M.A. from Duke University in 1966 and 1963 respectively after receiving a B.A. from Utica College in 1962. Lentricchia is currently a literature and film studies professor at Duke University.

Works

Academic 
The Gaiety of Language : An Essay On The Radical Poetics Of W. B. Yeats And Wallace Stevens (1968) 
Robert Frost: Modern Poetics and the Landscapes of Self (1975) 
Robert Frost: A Bibliography, 1913 – 1974 (1976) with Melissa Christensen Lentricchia 
After the New Criticism (1980)  
Criticism and Social Change (1983)  
Ariel and the Police: Michel Foucault, William James, Wallace Stevens (1989) 
New Essays on White Noise (1991) editor, with Emory Elliot, on White Noise by Don DeLillo 
Introducing Don DeLillo (1991) editor 
Modernist Quartet (1994) 
Critical Terms for Literary Study (1995) with Thomas McLaughlin  
Dissent from the Homeland: Essays After September 11 (2003) editor, with Stanley Hauerwas 
Close Reading: The Reader (2003) editor, with Andrew Dubois 
Crimes of Art and Terror (2003) with Jody McAuliffe

Non-Fiction 
The Edge of Night. A Confession (1994)

Fiction 
Johnny Critelli and The Knifemen: Two Novels (1996) 
The Music of the Inferno (1999) novel 
Lucchesi and the Whale (2001) 
The Book of Ruth (2005) 
The Italian Actress (2010)The Sadness of Antonioni (2011)  The Portable Lentricchia (2012) 

Eliot Conte Novels The Accidental Pallbearer (2012)  The Dog Killer of Utica (2014)The Morelli Thing (2015)

References
Xu, Ben (1992) Situational Tensions of Critic-Intellectuals: Thinking through Literary Politics with Edward W. Said and Frank LentricchiaDepietro, Thomas, ed. (2011) Frank Lentricchia: Essays on His Works''. Canada: Guernica Editions Inc.

External links
 Lentricchia's faculty page at Duke
 Lentricchia feature from Duke Magazine
 Interview with Lentricchia and Jody McAuliffe

1940 births
Living people
Utica University alumni
American literary critics
Duke University alumni
Duke University faculty